The Spartan NP-1 was a two-seat primary trainer designed and built by the Spartan Aircraft Company for the United States Navy reserve units.

Development
On 10 July 1940 the company received an order from the United States Navy for 201 aircraft for use as a biplane primary trainer, it was to be a modernised version of the companies earlier C-3. It was a conventional biplane with two-seats in tandem open cockpits. Designated by the company as the NS-1 it was given the military designation NP-1. The NP-1 was powered by a 220 hp (164 kW) Lycoming R-680-8 radial engine.

Operators

United States Navy

Specifications (NP-1)

See also

References

 

1940s United States military trainer aircraft
Spartan Aircraft Company aircraft
Biplanes
Single-engined tractor aircraft